Zafer Çevik (born 20 January 1984) is a Turkish professional footballer who plays as a left winger for an amateur side Ödemişspor.

Career
On 31 August 2016, he joined Bucaspor on a two-year contract.

References

External links
 
 
 

1984 births
Footballers from İzmir
Living people
Turkish footballers
Association football midfielders
Bakırköyspor footballers
Gebzespor footballers
Kartalspor footballers
Denizlispor footballers
Bucaspor footballers
Adana Demirspor footballers
Kayseri Erciyesspor footballers
Süper Lig players
TFF First League players
TFF Second League players
TFF Third League players